K. Vignarajah was the 3rd Governor of Western Province, in Sri Lanka. He held office from 1995 to 2000, he was succeeded by Pathmanathan Ramanathan.

References

Governors of Western Province, Sri Lanka
Year of birth missing (living people)
Living people